Overstone Kondowe is a Malawi Congress Party politician who has been the Member of Parliament (MP) for Nkhotakota North East since 2021. He is the country's first MP with albinism. He was a Presidential Advisor on Persons with Disabilities.

Kondowe was elected to the National Assembly in a by-election following the death of the constituency's previous MP Martha Chanjo Lunji of the Democratic Progressive Party.

References

Members of the National Assembly (Malawi)
People with albinism
Living people
Year of birth missing (living people)